Valsaria insitiva is a plant pathogen, that causes perennial canker in apples and almonds.

See also 
 List of apple diseases
 List of almond diseases

References

External links 
 Index Fungorum
 USDA ARS Fungal Database

Dothideomycetes enigmatic taxa
Fungi described in 1863
Fungal tree pathogens and diseases
Apple tree diseases
Fruit tree diseases